Hilde Eiserhardt (born February 24, 1888 in  (Waldems), died April 6, 1955 in Frankfurt) was a German lawyer in a leading role at the German Association for Public and Private Welfare. At the German Association for Public and Private Welfare (DV), Eiserhardt was a speaker from 1919, and then from 1922 to 1936 Deputy Managing Director of the DV under Wilhelm Polligkeit. She was a vehement proponent of a never-issued preservation law, which should regulate the legal basis for a compulsory placement of the so-called "anti-social" and "inferior".

References

1888 births
1955 deaths
20th-century German lawyers
People from Rheingau-Taunus-Kreis